Bernardino Corio (born 1459 in Milan; died ca.1519) was an Italian humanist and historian of the Renaissance. He wrote Historia di Milano circa 1500.

Biography 
Bernardino Corio came from a renowned Milanese family that had served the Sforza for over 250 years. He began his career as chamberlain of Galeazzo Maria in 1474, and was a witness to the latter's murder on 26 December 1476. He subsequently held various offices at the Sforza Court before entering into the circle of Duke Ludovico Sforza, an endorsement that led him to assume first the office of regional podestà in the 1490s, then the appointment as Giudice delle Strade (in charge of road maintenance). The latter office constituted Ludovico il Moro's sign of gratitude for the Historia Patria, the first chronicle of the city of Milan written in the Italian. Corio's Historia traces the history of Milan from its origins until 1499, when Ludovico il Moro was forced out by the French. Corio began his history around 1485, initially with the support of Ludovico Sforza, who actively desired the Sforza claim to Milan to be justified and its deeds embellished. The Duke strove to facilitate Corio's work. In 1497 he ordered the civil and religious authorities in Valtellina and in Como to permit the writer access to their archives and libraries. Part of the documents were moved to a comfortable lodging house, while those volumes in need of more in-depth consultation were carried to Milan. Ludovico also placed an assistant, Francesco Bianchi, at Corio's disposal and supported the challenge with the amount of 50 lire. By the time the history was completed, however, the Sforza had been overthrown and Ludovico had been captured by the French. Following Ludovico's downfall, Corio left Milan. In 1503 the Historia was finally concluded and printed under the supervision of the author. Nothing is known about his fate thereafter.

Works 

 Historia continente da l'origine di Milano tutti li gesti, fatti, e detti preclari. Milan: Alessandro Minuziano, for the Legnano brothers, 1503.

References

Literature
Stefano Meschini: Uno storico umanista alla corte sforzesca. Biografia di Bernardino Corio (= Biblioteca di storia moderna e contemporanea 8 = Pubblicazioni della Università Cattolica del Sacro Cuore. Scienze storiche 58). Vita e Pensiero, Milano 1995, .
 

16th-century Italian historians
15th-century Italian historians
1459 births
Writers from Milan